Rikyū is a crater on Mercury.  Its name was adopted by the International Astronomical Union (IAU) on June 18, 2013. Rikyū is named for Japanese tea master and designer of the Japanese tea ceremony Sen no Rikyū.

Rikyū is west of the slightly larger crater Varma.

References

Impact craters on Mercury